Colleville-Montgomery (formerly Colleville-sur-Orne) is a commune in the Calvados department in the Normandy region in northern France. It was known as Colleville-sur-Orne until 13 June 1946 to distinguish it from another town in the department, also in a coastal location, Colleville-sur-Mer. The new name honoured Field Marshal The 1st Viscount Montgomery of Alamein, the senior-ranking British military commander who commanded the invasion of Normandy on 6 June 1944. There are two neighbouring towns in Calvados called Sainte-Foy-de-Montgommery and Saint-Germain-de-Montgommery, but they are named for Montgomery's family ancestors. They were part of William the Conqueror's invading army in 1066 and settled in England.  The town was featured in the 1962 film, The Longest Day, detailing the French Resistance and their efforts on D-Day.

Sights
 The Church
Built by Saint-Vigor, Bishop of the city of Bayeux (511-531), during the 11th and 12th centuries, it has two choirs and a Romanesque nave.

The first bay consists in barrel vaults. The other vaults are more recent, built at the same time as the arches which lead to the second choir, from the thirteenth century.

The side tower from the twelfth century for the lower part is of Romanesque design, and from the fifteenth century for the upper part with a terrace on top surrounded by a parapet, and contains three bells. The bell tower, partially destroyed during the liberation of the area, was reconstructed.

The windows were designed in the style of Gothic architecture and their stained glass were restored after World War II.

 Hillman Fortress
Built by the German army in 1942, it consists of a complex of bunkers which are being restored since 1990 by an association called "Les Amis du Suffolk Régiment".
Free guided visits are organised during the summer.
 La Redoute
Located at the end of Vauban street, this fortification was built in 1779 according to a design by Vauban. Half of it still remains visible.

Tourism
There is a camping place located about 200 m from the beach.

Population

International relations
Colleville-Montgomery is twinned with:
  Kleinrinderfeld, Germany

See also
Colleville-sur-Mer
Communes of the Calvados department

References

External links

Official Website
Website of "Les Amis du Suffolk Régiment"

Communes of Calvados (department)
Seaside resorts in France
Calvados communes articles needing translation from French Wikipedia